Mick Ryan (born 1946 in Doon, County Offaly) is an Irish retired sportsperson.  He played Gaelic football with Dublin-based club Erin's Isle and was a member of the Offaly senior inter-county team from 1965 until 1976.

References

1946 births
Living people
Doon Gaelic footballers
Erins Isle Gaelic footballers
Offaly inter-county Gaelic footballers